Roger Ware Brockett (born October 22, 1938 in Seville, Ohio) is an American control theorist and the An Wang Professor of Computer Science and Electrical Engineering at Harvard University, who founded the Harvard Robotics Laboratory in 1983.

Brockett became a member of the National Academy of Engineering in 1991 for outstanding contributions to the theory and practice of linear and nonlinear control systems.

Biography
Brockett was born on October 22, 1938 in Seville, Ohio to Roger Lawrence and Grace Ester (Patch) Brockett.

Brockett received his B.S. from Case Western Reserve University in 1960, and continued on to receive his M.S. in 1962 and his Ph.D. in 1964 from Case Western Reserve University as well. His Ph.D. dissertation was The Invertibility of Dynamic Systems with Application to Control under the supervision of Mihajlo D. Mesarovic.

After teaching at the Massachusetts Institute of Technology from 1963 to 1969, he joined the faculty at Harvard University.  At Harvard, Brockett became the Gordon McKay Professor of Applied Mathematics and in 1989 the An Wang Professor of Computer Science and Electrical Engineering.

Brockett is known for his work on control theory and linear differential systems; in 1970 he published the textbook Finite Dimensional Linear Systems.  Brockett has advised over 50 students, including Daniel Liberzon, Jan Willems, David Dobkin, John Baras, P. S. Krishnaprasad, and John Baillieul.

Awards and honors
Brockett received several awards and honors, including:
 Fellow of the Institute of Electrical and Electronics Engineers (IEEE) since 1974
 Member of the National Academy of Engineering in 1991
 In 1989 the Richard E. Bellman Control Heritage Award from the American Automatic Control Council
 In 1991 the IEEE Control Systems Science and Engineering Award
 In 1996 the "W.T. and Idalia Reid Prize in Mathematics" from the Society for Industrial and Applied Mathematics
 In 2005 the Rufus Oldenburger Medal from the American Society of Mechanical Engineers
 In 2009 the IEEE Leon K. Kirchmayer Graduate Teaching Award
 In 2012 he became a fellow of the American Mathematical Society.
 In 2017 he won the Quazza Medal from the International Federation of Automatic Control (IFAC) https://www.ifac-control.org/awards/major-awards#quazza

Trivia
 Roger Brockett and Donald Knuth were classmates at Case Western

References

External links
Brockett's web page at Harvard
Biography at the University of Maryland.

American computer scientists
Case Western Reserve University alumni
Control theorists
Fellow Members of the IEEE
John A. Paulson School of Engineering and Applied Sciences faculty
MIT School of Engineering faculty
American roboticists
Richard E. Bellman Control Heritage Award recipients
1938 births
Living people
Fellows of the Society for Industrial and Applied Mathematics
Fellows of the American Mathematical Society
Members of the United States National Academy of Engineering
People from Seville, Ohio
Engineers from Ohio